Teatro Circo Barcelonés was a theater in Barcelona between 1853 and 1944.

References 

 
 

Theatres and concert halls in Barcelona